William Marsh Acker Jr. (October 25, 1927 – June 21, 2018) was a United States district judge of the United States District Court for the Northern District of Alabama.

Education and career
Acker was born in Birmingham, Alabama and served in the United States Army as a private first class from 1946 to 1947. He received a Bachelor of Arts degree from Birmingham–Southern College in 1949 and a Bachelor of Laws from Yale Law School in 1952. He was an attorney in private practice in Birmingham for thirty years, from 1952 to 1982.

Federal judicial service
Acker was nominated by President Ronald Reagan on July 22, 1982, to a seat on the United States District Court for the Northern District of Alabama vacated by Judge Frank Hampton McFadden. He was confirmed by the United States Senate on August 18, 1982, and received his commission the same day. He assumed senior status on May 31, 1996. He took inactive senior status on September 30, 2016, meaning that while he remained a federal judge, he did not hear cases or participate in the business of the court. He remained in that status until his death on June 21, 2018.

Notable cases
In 2007, Acker recommended that the United States Attorney charge Richard Scruggs and the Scruggs Law Firm with criminal contempt for leaking documents in violation of a court order; in 2008, he accused Mississippi Attorney General Jim Hood of conspiring with Scruggs to skirt the court order. In 2008, Acker held the Fair and Accurate Credit Transactions Act unconstitutional in order to impose disproportionate punitive damages ($65,000) on two women defendants who caused no harm (were whistle-blowers exposing insurance fraud), yet Acker did not fine the men found guilty of the insurance fraud. Acker's decision was overturned in 2009.

References

Sources
 

1927 births
2018 deaths
Lawyers from Birmingham, Alabama
Military personnel from Birmingham, Alabama
Alabama lawyers
Birmingham–Southern College alumni
Yale Law School alumni
Judges of the United States District Court for the Northern District of Alabama
United States district court judges appointed by Ronald Reagan
20th-century American judges
United States Army soldiers